Lundsbergs boarding school is a Swedish boarding school located in the Parish of Storfors north of Kristinehamn in Värmland, Sweden. Lundsberg was founded in 1896 with inspirations from classical English boarding schools, and has approximately 200 students today. The school is run by the Lundsbergs school Foundation, Stiftelsen Lundsbergs skola and is well known for its conservative atmosphere.

The school is one of the three elite boarding schools in Sweden. Annual tuition is 285,000 SEK. The cost is subsidized by the state but augmented by parents. The school consists of six dormitories, of which three are boys' dormitories (Forest Hill, Björke and Gransäter), and three are girls' dormitories (Klätten, Herrgården and Skogshult).

History
Lundsbergs Boarding School was founded by the businessman William Olsson 30 January 1896. The school at that time was characterized of the ideals to form the future leaders of the country via religious studies in a Spartan environment.

The school commenced in Lundsberg's Herrgård. However, as the student number rose more student housing, staff buildings, and sport facilities were built. The Main Building was constructed 1906-1907 under the drawings of the architect Erik Lallerstedts. The current sports field was officially opened 1923 by the then Crown Prince of Sweden Gustaf Adolf, Duke of Västerbotten.

At 1907 the school, which was previously owned by Lundsbergs AB, was handed over to the Lundsbergs School Foundation. Today, the committee of the foundation consists of former students, staff, and legal guardians of current pupils.

Lundsberg’s Church
Via a donation the school's church could be built under the drawings of Bror Almquist. H.R.H. Prince Gustaf Adolf laid the first stone at the construction site 6 June 1929 and the Diocesan Bishop J.A. Eklund blessed the area.  The Church, connected to the main school building, opened its doors 5 October 1930. The altar is made of green marble and the reredos is designed by the artist and former Lundsberg pupil Peder Jensen. All the Swedish princes who had graduated from the school at the time the church was completed, donated together a glass window for the church designed by Sigvard Bernadotte. The school's museum is in the basement of the church.

Today the school church is used for choir practice, church service, and morning gatherings before classes commence, as well as music and theatre lessons. There are four students, two girls and two boys, chosen each year to be Churchwardens. There are also four boys chosen to be Church Bell Ringers.

Boarding houses

Lundsbergs boarding school has eight houses, six of which are being used today. Each house has its own facilities, customs and traditions, and each compete against each other in a variety of activities for trophies to increase the house's reputation. There are around 220 students currently enrolled at the school, with the vast majority being boarders. The houses are:

Berga
Opened its doors 1924. In 1942, Berga became the Principles House and students were relocated to Skogshult.

Björke  
Was completed 1899 and is the school's third oldest student house. The house was originally boys-only, however Skogshult was renovated during 2014, making Björke into a mixed house. Now Björke is a boys-only house again. Its colours are red and white.

Forest Hill  
Finished 1898 and was the second house built on the school campus. Mary Cooper, the founder William Olsson's sister, decided to name the building Forest Hill at its opening ceremony.
Its house colours are black and yellow.

Lilla Hill  
Forest Hill recently (2019) opened a second house, Called Lilla Hill (Small Hill).

Gransäter  
Was completed 1902. It is often called "Royal Gransäter" because of its former students being Prince Gustaf Adolf (from 1918 to 1924) and Prince Sigvard Bernadotte (from 1918 to 1916). It is a boy's house and competes under the colours white and black.

Herrgården  
Herrgården is Lundsberg's oldest house and where the school commenced 1896 with only four students. Herrgården's dining room Kavaljeren, which dates back to the 18th century, has a beam ceiling and biblical paintings made in Dalarna on the wall. Prince Bertil, Duke of Halland, lived at Herrgården from 1926 to 1930. It is currently a girls-only house and its colours are blue and yellow.

Klätten  
Opened by Prince Bertil 10 September 1953. It was designed to have a corridor system so that in case of war breaking out it could easily transform into a hospital. It is a girl's house but it changed to a mixed house for a short while. Its colours are burgundy and grey.

Skogshult  
Was finished 1913 and was then built to be a boys house. 1985 the Annex, now Lilla Hill, was built for girls making it the only mixed house at the school. Now Skogshult is a girls' house. One of their alumni is Prince Carl Philip, who lived there from 1996 to 1999. Their house colours are blue and white.

Activities

Lundsbergaren
Lundsbergaren is Sweden's oldest school newspaper and started year 1910. It is published four times per year and is edited by the school's editorial team, which consists of current students. The newspaper contains reports from the school, sport results, interviews with staff, and writings from FGL (the association for former students). The newspaper is censored by a member of staff as well as FGL and must follow the school policies.

Sports
Sport and health have been the main emphasis and tradition at the school for over a century, hence the school's motto Mens sana in corpore sano, which translates as "a healthy mind in a healthy body". Lundsbergs's campus houses a range of sports facilities. Continuously during the year there are several individual sports training and competition between students or between student houses at the school. The school also competes with varsity teams in SIPSI (a sport organisations for Swedish boarding-and private schools), which includes Lundsberg's School, Enskilda gymnasiet, Grennaskolan, Sigtunaskolan Humanistiska Läroverket, and Viktor Rydberg Gymnasium. 2010 was the first year of Gant Rowing Race, a rowing race between the rival schools Lundsberg Boarding School and Sigtuna Humanistiska Läroverket.

Arts
Music has, since Lundsbergs's church was built, been a vital part of the education and curricular activities at the school. The school has a student choir as well as a staff choir. Theatre has during the decades developed and become a growing platform at the school. Johan Rabaeus and Sven Lindberg are two alumni famous for acting.

Controversy
On 28 August 2013, the Swedish School Inspectorate closed the school after recurring problems concerning abuse and bullying. The closure would apply for at least six months. On the evening of 28 August 2013, the boarding school announced that headmaster Staffan Hörnberg had been dismissed and that the governing board had offered their resignations. The specific allegations were of older boys burning younger boys with hot irons during hazing. When one was taken to a hospital for treatment, the police were informed and the schools inspectorate was notified. The schools inspectorate's recommendation to discontinue continued funding of the school by the government was reported to be under review. The schools inspectorate completed a lengthy investigation of bullying at the school in April 2013, but after threatening a fine of half a million dollars, a decision was made to continue to allow the school to operate based on its apparent success in overcoming bullying. The decision to close the school was due to the threat of imminent danger to students. Students were required to leave, but special arrangements had to be made for the 17 students whose parents were out of the country.

Public allegations of bullying emerged in 2011 with a spate of anonymous calls to the media and to the schools inspectorate. An investigation by The Guardian revealed evidence of a long-standing pattern of bullying. Petter Sandgren, a researcher at the European University Institute in Florence, advanced a theory that the children of new entrants to Sweden's elite, nouveau riches, had broken ranks with the old boy network which had previously suppressed reports of abuse. According to an elderly lady who had worked in the kitchens in the school in the 1950s: It's like time has stood still since I worked there – there is exactly the same spirit now as there was then, the school still lets the older pupils harass the younger ones and be cruel to them.I am so relieved that eyes have been opened and people see it for what it is. I never saw class society revealed so obviously as at Lundsberg – and it is still the same, like Upstairs Downstairs.

On September 6 Lundsberg was opened again.

Alumni
Famous Alumni include:
Prince Bertil
Prince Gustaf Adolf
Prince Carl Philip
Boris Hagelin
Ian Wachtmeister
Sigvard Bernadotte (designed the church window at the school)
Carl Johan Bernadotte
Sven Lindberg, actor
Johan Rabeus, actor
Christian von Koenigsegg
Carl Fredrik Reuterswärd
Carl Gustaf von Rosen
Peder Wallenberg
Tage William-Olsson
Lillian Strickland

Further reading 
 S. Carlbaum, Guardians of individual rights?: Media representation of the school Lundsberg vs. the Swedish Schools Inspectorate, (Umeå University, 2014) 
 P. Sandgren, ”Mens sana in corpore sano”: Article about the Swedish boarding school Lundsberg (in swedish) - En studie om Lundsbergs fostrande funktion åren 1910–1968. In "Fostran i skola och utbildning: Historiska perspektiv, (Uppsala, 2012)
 A. Hellström, Att vara utan att synas. Sveriges tre riksinternat: Lundsberg, Sigtuna och Grenna, (2013)
 A. Larsson (ed). Årsböcker i svensk undervisningshistoria, vol. 212, (Uppsala, 2010)
 A. Hellström,  Ränderna går aldrig ur (2010)

References

External links

Lundsbergs Skola website

Boarding schools in Sweden
Educational institutions established in 1896
1896 establishments in Sweden
Buildings and structures in Storfors Municipality